Bis(4-bromobenzyl) ketone is a variation of dibenzyl ketone containing 2 bromine atoms at the para positions of the phenyl rings.

Preparation
Bis(4-bromobenzyl) ketone may be prepared in the laboratory by self-condensation of 4-bromophenylacetic acid using DCC and DMAP.

Reactions
Bis(4-bromobenzyl) ketone reacts with benzil in the presence of base in a double aldol condensation to form 2,5-bis(4-bromophenyl)-3,4-diphenylcyclopentadienone. As this tetraphenylcyclopentadienone derivative may be condensed with diphenylacetylenes, this makes it a useful precursor to symmetrical hexaphenylbenzene and coronene derivatives.

See also
Dibenzyl ketone

References 

Dibenzyl ketones